Burnt Hill is a small rural community in the Waimakariri District, New Zealand. It is named for the small extinct volcano in the township's south-east corner.

Climate
The average temperature in summer is 16.2 °C, and in winter is 5.9 °C.

References

Waimakariri District
Populated places in Canterbury, New Zealand